Stockpile stewardship refers to the United States program of reliability testing and maintenance of its nuclear weapons without the use of nuclear testing.

Because no new nuclear weapons have been developed by the United States since 1992, even its youngest weapons are at least  years old (as of ). Aging weapons can fail or act unpredictably in a number of ways: the high explosives that compress their fissile material can chemically degrade, their electronic components can suffer from decay, their radioactive plutonium/uranium cores are potentially unreliable, and the isotopes used by thermonuclear weapons may be chemically unstable as well.

Since the United States has also not tested nuclear weapons since 1992, this leaves the task of its stockpile maintenance resting on the use of simulations (using non-nuclear explosives tests and supercomputers, among other methods) and applications of scientific knowledge about physics and chemistry to the specific problems of weapons aging (the latter method is what is meant when various agencies refer to their work as "science-based"). It also involves the manufacture of additional plutonium "pits" to replace ones of unknown quality, and finding other methods to increase the lifespan of existing warheads and maintain a credible nuclear deterrent.

Most work for stockpile stewardship is undertaken at United States Department of Energy national laboratories, mostly at Los Alamos National Laboratory, Sandia National Laboratories, Lawrence Livermore National Laboratory, the Nevada Test Site, and Department of Energy productions facilities, which employ around 27,500 personnel and cost billions of dollars per year to operate.

Stockpile Stewardship and Management Program
The Stockpile Stewardship and Management Program is a United States Department of Energy program to ensure that the nuclear capabilities of the United States are not eroded as nuclear weapons age. It costs more than $4 billion annually to test nuclear weapons and build advanced science facilities, such as the National Ignition Facility (NIF). Such facilities have been deemed necessary under the program since President Bill Clinton signed the Comprehensive Test Ban Treaty (CTBT) in 1996, The US Senate never ratified the CTBT. President Obama initiated a broad effort to modernize U.S. nuclear forces, which the Congressional Budget Office estimates will require approximately $494 billion to complete.

Facilities
The stockpile stewardship program is supported by the following experimental facilities:

 Dual-Axis Radiographic Hydrodynamic Test Facility, Los Alamos National Laboratory
 Contained Firing Facility, Lawrence Livermore National Laboratory
 National Ignition Facility, Lawrence Livermore National Laboratory
 Z machine, Sandia National Laboratories
 Omega, Laboratory for Laser Energetics
 High Explosive Application Facility, Lawrence Livermore National Laboratory
 Joint Actinide Shock Physics Experimental Research, Nevada National Security Site
 Large Bore Powder Gun, Nevada National Security Site
 Los Alamos Neutron Science Center, Los Alamos National Laboratory
 Proton Radiography, Los Alamos National Laboratory
 Big Explosives Experimental Facility, Nevada National Security Site
 TA-55, Los Alamos National Laboratory
 U1a Facility, Nevada National Security Site

The data produced by the experiments carried out in these facilities is used in combination with the Advanced Simulation and Computing Program.

See also
Enduring Stockpile

References

External links
 
 
 The Stockpile Stewardship and Management Program (DOE document, May 1995)
 

Nuclear weapons program of the United States

Lawrence Livermore National Laboratory